SDSSJ0946+1006 is an unusual gravitational lens system consisting of three galaxies at distances of respectively three, six, and eleven billion light years from Earth. In a report presented at the 211th meeting of the American Astronomical Society, researchers Raphael Gavazzi and Tommaso Treu of the University of California, Santa Barbara described the discovery of a double Einstein ring produced by the gravitational lensing of light from two distant galaxies. The observations were made using the Hubble Space Telescope.

References

External links
HubbleSite Hubble Finds Double Einstein Ring January 10, 2008 10:00 AM (EST)

Gravitational lensing
SDSS objects